Zofia Żółkiewska (c. 1590–1634) was a Polish noblewoman, daughter of Great Hetman of the Crown Stanisław Żółkiewski and grandmother of King Jan III Sobieski.

In 1605 she married the voivode of the Ruthenian Voivodship Jan Daniłowicz and had four children:

 Zofia Teofila - mother of King of Poland Jan III Sobieski
 Stanisław (d. 1636) - killed by Tatars
 Jan (b. 1613, d. 1618)
 Dorota - Benedictine Abbess in Lwów since 1640

Bibliography
Tadeusz Korzon, Dola i niedola Jana Sobieskiego, Kraków 1898, Tablica I. (Wielkopolska Biblioteka Cyfrowa)
de Battaglia O. F., Ze studiów genealogicznych nad epoką Jana III Sobieskiego [w:] Miesięcznik Heraldyczny. Organ Polskiego Towarzystwa Heraldycznego wydawany przez Oddział Warszawski. R.12 1933 nr 9, Warszawa 1933, s. 133. (Wielkopolska Biblioteka Cyfrowa)

1590s births
1634 deaths
Zofia
Year of birth uncertain
People from Zhovkva